Montalto Carpasio is a comune (municipality) in the Province of Imperia in the Italian region Liguria.

It was established on 1 January 2018 by the merger of the municipalities of Montalto Ligure and Carpasio.

References

Cities and towns in Liguria